Lill-Janskogen, (English: "Little Jan's Forest"), is a park in Stockholm, Sweden.

Description
It is located on northern Djurgården and is a popular area for recreational activities. The Ugglevik spring was a traditional drinking water source in the Lill-Jansskogen forest. The name derives from the nearby bay,  Uggleviken. Today  only the well pavilion, dating  from 1902, remains and the water is undrinkable.

In the middle of Lill-Jansskogen is  Ugglevik reservoir (Uggleviksreservoaren). This water reservoir dates from 1935 and was designed by the functionalist architect Paul Hedqvist (1895-1977).

For the 1956 Summer Olympics, the park hosted part of the event portion of the equestrian events.

Gallery

See also 
 Geography of Stockholm

References

External links

Venues of the 1956 Summer Olympics
Olympic equestrian venues
Djurgården
Parks in Stockholm
Urban forests